Peru is a city in Chautauqua County, Kansas, United States.  As of the 2020 census, the population of the city was 101.

History
Peru was founded in 1870. It was named by E. R. Cutler, president of the town company, for his hometown of Peru, Illinois.

Geography
Peru is located at  (37.081299, -96.096277).

Demographics

2010 census
As of the census of 2010, there were 139 people, 67 households, and 36 families residing in the city. The racial makeup of the city was 82.0% White, 8.6% Native American, 0.7% from other races, and 8.6% from two or more races. Hispanic or Latino of any race were 3.6% of the population.

There were 67 households, of which 19.4% had children under the age of 18 living with them, 47.8% were married couples living together, 3.0% had a female householder with no husband present, 3.0% had a male householder with no wife present, and 46.3% were non-families. 43.3% of all households were made up of individuals, and 6% had someone living alone who was 65 years of age or older. The average household size was 2.07 and the average family size was 2.81.

The median age in the city was 49.3 years. 16.5% of residents were under the age of 18; 11.6% were between the ages of 18 and 24; 14.4% were from 25 to 44; 35.3% were from 45 to 64; and 22.3% were 65 years of age or older. The gender makeup of the city was 54.7% male and 45.3% female.

2000 census
As of the census of 2000, there were 183 people, 87 households, and 50 families residing in the city. The racial makeup of the city was 92.35% White, 1.64% African American, 4.37% Native American, and 1.64% from two or more races.

There were 87 households, out of which 23.0% had children under the age of 18 living with them, 39.1% were married couples living together, 9.2% had a female householder with no husband present, and 42.5% were non-families. 40.2% of all households were made up of individuals, and 21.8% had someone living alone who was 65 years of age or older. The average household size was 2.10 and the average family size was 2.78.

In the city, the population was spread out, with 23.0% under the age of 18, 4.9% from 18 to 24, 24.6% from 25 to 44, 24.6% from 45 to 64, and 23.0% who were 65 years of age or older. The median age was 42 years. For every 100 females, there were 90.6 males. For every 100 females age 18 and over, there were 101.4 males.

The median income for a household in the city was $25,208, and the median income for a family was $31,875. Males had a median income of $15,625 versus $12,143 for females. The per capita income for the city was $13,810. About 6.4% of families and 11.9% of the population were below the poverty line, including 13.3% of those under the age of eighteen and 8.3% of those 65 or over.

Education
Peru is served by Chautauqua County USD 286 public school district, and its Sedan Jr/Sr High School is located in Sedan.

Peru High School was closed through school unification. The Peru High School mascot was Trojans.

Transportation
Highway U.S. Route 166 runs through Peru.

Notable people
 Madelyn Dunham (1922-2008), maternal grandmother of Barack Obama, was born in Peru. She died on November 2, 2008, two days before her grandson was elected president.

References

Further reading

External links
 Peru - Directory of Public Officials
 USD 286, local school district
 Peru city map, KDOT

Cities in Kansas
Cities in Chautauqua County, Kansas